Magic City is the second studio album by New Zealand music producer P-Money. It was released in late 2004 through Dirty Records with distribution via Festival Mushroom Records. Production was handled entirely by P-Money, who also served as executive producer together with Callum August. It features guest appearances from Con Psy, Scribe, Aasim, PNC, Skillz, Sauce Money, Jatis, Akon, Capone, Mystro, Roc Raida and Tyna.

The album debuted at number 2 on the NZ Official Top 40 Albums, and was certified Gold by the Recording Industry Association of New Zealand on the same day. On 20 December 2004 it was certified Platinum. In 2005, it won 'Best Hip Hop Release' at bNet NZ Music Awards and 'Best Urban Album' at RIANZ New Zealand Music Awards.

It was supported by singles: "Stop the Music" and "Keep on Callin'", which both went charted on the Official New Zealand Music Chart at number 1 and number 23, respectively. "Stop the Music" won 'Best Hip-Hop Single' at Australian Urban Music Awards in 2006.

Track listing

Charts

Certifications

References

External links

2004 albums
P-Money albums
Albums produced by P-Money